Vitaliy Vladimirovich Starukhin (born 6 June 1949 in Minsk; died 9 August 2000) was a Ukrainian professional footballer who played as a forward. He is considered by many fans to one be the greatest players to ever play for Shakhtar Donetsk.

In 1979, he was awarded Player of the year award. In 1979 Starukhin played couple of games for Ukraine at the Spartakiad of the Peoples of the USSR.

In 2011 Vitaly Starukhin, together with Oleg Blokhin and Igor Belanov was named as "the legends of Ukrainian football" at the Victory of Football awards.

Career statistics

Honours
Shakhtar Donetsk
Soviet Top League: runner-up 1975, 1979; bronze 1978
Soviet Cup: 1980

Individual
Soviet Top League top scorer: 1979 (26 goals)
Soviet Footballer of the Year: 1979
Best rookie player: 1973

References

External links
 

1949 births
2000 deaths
Footballers from Minsk
Deaths from pneumonia in Ukraine
Soviet footballers
FC Vorskla Poltava players
FC Shakhtar Donetsk players
Soviet Top League players
Ukrainian footballers
Association football forwards